The 2004 HEW Cyclassics was the ninth edition of the German single-day race. It took place August 1, 2004 and it was won by Stuart O'Grady, racing for Cofidis.

Results

External links
Results from cyclingnews.com

2005
Hew Cyclassics
2004 in German sport
August 2004 sports events in Europe
2004 in road cycling